Frank Powell was a stage and silent film actor, screenwriter and director in the United States.

Frank Powell may also refer to:
 David Franklin Powell (1847–1906), also known as D. Frank Powell, Wisconsin doctor, showman, patent medicine magnate and politician
 Frank John Powell (1891–1971), British politician and magistrate
 Frank Powell (footballer), English football manager
 Frank Neff Powell, bishop of the Episcopal diocese of Southwestern Virginia

See also
 Francis Powell (disambiguation)